State Highway 191 (SH 191) is a Texas state highway running from the north side of Odessa east to the western edge of Midland. The highway is usually used as a reliever route for local traffic between the two cities, as opposed to I-20 a few miles to the south.

Route description
SH 191 begins at an intersection with Spur 450 in western Odessa, just short of SH 302 and Loop 338. The highway runs east along 42nd Street, soon crossing U.S. Highway 385 (US 385). In the eastern part of the city, SH 191 crosses by Music City Mall and the University of Texas at the Permian Basin and picks up freeway status at the eastern leg of Loop 338. The highway passes through mostly rural land, with some subdivisions nearby. The highway exits the Odessa city limits and enters into Midland County. SH 191 crosses SH 349 just north of Midland International Airport and enters into Midland. A few miles to the northeast of here, SH 158 joins the highway, with the two running together until Loop 250, where SH 191 ends, but the mainlanes continues east into the city as a business route of SH 158.

History
SH 191 was originally designated on November 28, 1932, on a route from Albany south to Coleman. On September 26, 1939, this route had been transferred to US 183. The current SH 191 was designated on August 31, 1977, from SH 158 southwest to Loop 338 & Spur 492.

On August 4, 1970, Spur 492 was extended west to another point on Loop 338. This mileage was transferred to SH 191 on April 26, 1983.

Junction list

References

191
Transportation in Ector County, Texas
Transportation in Midland County, Texas
Freeways in Texas